"The Happiest Girl in the Whole USA" is a country and pop music song written, composed, and recorded by Donna Fargo. It is written in the voice of a newlywed girl, sung to her new husband. It has since become her signature song.

Background
Fargo told Tom Roland in The Billboard Book of Number One Country Hits that she wrote the song with a different title originally. "It really started out to be 'Happiest Girl in the World,' but the rhyme scheme got to be too unnatural, so I changed it to 'U.S.A.' It kind of wrote itself after that."

Copyright infringement rumor
A rumor later circulated that the line "skip-a-dee-doo-dah" was originally written as "zip-a-dee-doo-dah," and that the Walt Disney Company subsequently sued Fargo as soon as they became aware of the song and its line, demanding that the original line be changed. Fargo has since put the rumor to rest, stating that "skip-a-dee-doo-dah" was indeed the original line and that no such lawsuit ever took place.

Commercial performance
The song, Fargo's first single on Dot Records, became a number-one country hit in the spring of 1972, and subsequently became a hit on the Billboard Hot 100 pop music chart, peaking at No. 11, and Billboard Easy Listening Singles chart, where it reached No. 7. Billboard ranked it as the No. 55 song for 1972. The record earned Fargo a Grammy for Best Country Vocal Performance, Female, at the 15th Annual Grammy Awards on March 3, 1973.

Notable cover interpretations
 The song was covered by Tammy Wynette on her 1972 album My Man.
 Nancy Sinatra covered the song for the album Woman.
 Tanya Tucker also recorded the song in 1972 for her first album Delta Dawn. Her producer, Billy Sherrill, had planned for it to be her first single, but Tucker convinced him to allow her to record and release "Delta Dawn" instead.
 The song was sung by actress Daveigh Chase in a 2007 episode of the HBO television series Big Love.
 On April 15, 2012, a video of Lana Del Rey performing the song at a gig in 2009 was uploaded to YouTube.
 Debbie Rule covered the song on her album Texas Girls (2015).

Charts

References

1972 debut singles
Donna Fargo songs
Songs written by Donna Fargo
Dot Records singles
1972 songs